Dustin Brown and Rogier Wassen were the defending champions, but decided not to participate together.
Brown plays alongside Michael Kohlmann, while Wassen partners up with Lukáš Rosol. Brown lost in the first round to Santiago Giraldo and Pere Riba and Wassen lost in the second round to Franco Ferreiro and André Sá.

Daniele Bracciali and Santiago González won the title, defeating Franco Ferreiro and André Sá 7–6(7–1), 4–6, [11–9] in the final.

Seeds

Draw

Draw

References
 Main Draw

Bet-at-home Cup Kitzbuhel - Doubles
2011 Doubles